Hellmayr's pipit (Anthus hellmayri) is a species of bird in the family Motacillidae.
It is found in Argentina, Bolivia, Brazil, Chile, Paraguay, Peru, and Uruguay.
Its natural habitats are temperate grassland, subtropical or tropical high-altitude grassland, and pastureland.

References

Hellmayr's pipit
Birds of South America
Hellmayr's pipit
Taxonomy articles created by Polbot
Taxa named by Ernst Hartert